Vyacheslav Petrovich Kovneristov (born 20 March 1973) is a former Russian professional footballer. He made his debut in the Russian Premier League in 1997 for FC KAMAZ-Chally Naberezhnye Chelny.

References

1973 births
Living people
Russian footballers
FC KAMAZ Naberezhnye Chelny players
Russian Premier League players
FC SKA Rostov-on-Don players
FC Volga Nizhny Novgorod players
Association football goalkeepers
FC Elista players
FC Arsenal Tula players
FC Neftekhimik Nizhnekamsk players
FC Nosta Novotroitsk players